Ang Mo Kio Town Garden East is a community park that is situated at the junction of Ang Mo Kio Avenues 3 and 8, behind Ang Mo Kio MRT station.

See also
Ang Mo Kio Town Garden West
List of parks in Singapore

References

External links
National Parks Board
Ang Mo Kio Town Garden East
Ang Mo Kio Town Garden East Information

Gardens in Singapore
Parks in Singapore